Fosters Ridge is an unincorporated community in Clark Township, Perry County, in the U.S. state of Indiana.

History
A post office was established at Fosters Ridge in 1858, and remained in operation until 1890. The community's namesake, Alexander Foster, served as postmaster.

Geography

References

Unincorporated communities in Perry County, Indiana
Unincorporated communities in Indiana